The Great Northern Railway Class H2 and H3 (classified K1 and K2 by the LNER) was a class of 2-6-0 steam locomotive designed for mixed-traffic work.

The class was created as a locomotive which could haul heavier goods trains at speeds of up to 40 mph. The class were later developed into the more powerful H4 (LNER K3) class. After formation of the London and North Eastern Railway, the type became known as class K1 and K2 and was adopted as an LNER standard design. They got the nickname "Ragtimers" because of their lively nature when running at speed and their use of Walschaerts valve gear which was uncommon on the GNR at the time.

Construction 
The ten K1s were built at the GNR's Doncaster Works in 1912–1913, to the design of Nigel Gresley.  Five batches of K2s, also to the design of Gresley, were built at Doncaster, the North British Locomotive Company, and Kitson and Company between 1914 and 1921. These were the first design to incorporate Gresley's patented double swing link pony truck design.

Use 
They were excellent mixed-traffic locomotives, but began to be displaced by the larger and stronger K3s. They were moved to former Great Eastern and North British lines to supplement existing engines. Twenty K2s were fitted with Westinghouse pumps so they could pull passenger trains from Liverpool Street on the Colchester and Cambridge lines.

Rebuilding 
No. 4635 was rebuilt from K1 to K2 in 1920. No. 4631 was rebuilt in 1921. No further K1s were rebuilt until 1931, when a shortage of K1 boilers necessitated rebuilds. The remaining eight were rebuilt between 1931 and 1937, making the K1 class extinct.

Numbering 
The K1s were numbered 1630–1639 by the GNR, and became LNER 4630-4639. The K2s were numbered 1640–1704 by the GNR, and became LNER 4640-4704. In the LNER's 1946 renumbering programme, the K2s were renumbered 1720–1794, and they later became British Railways 61720–61794.

Names 
None of the K1s were named. However, some of the K2s based in Scotland received names in 1933–34.

Withdrawal 
All K2s were withdrawn and scrapped between 1955 and 1962.

Notes

References

External links 

 LNER encyclopedia
 BR database entry

H3
2-6-0 locomotives
Railway locomotives introduced in 1912
Railway locomotives introduced in 1914
NBL locomotives
Kitson locomotives
Standard gauge steam locomotives of Great Britain
Scrapped locomotives